10 Pashons - Coptic calendar - 12 Pashons

Fixed commemorations
All fixed commemorations below are observed on 11 Pashons (19 May) by the Coptic Orthodox Church.

Saints
Saint Theoclia
Saint Paphnutius the Bishop

References
Coptic Synexarion

Days of the Coptic calendar